Lyckebyån is a river in Sweden.

References

Rivers of Blekinge County